Balwinder Singh Famous Ho Gaya is a 2014 Indian Hindi-language comedy drama film, directed by Sunil Agnihotri and produced by Sunil Agnihotri Productions, Vandana Motion Pictures Pvt Ltd.

Plot

Balwinder Singh Famous Ho Gaya (2014) is two central characters Mika Singh and Shaan and the confusion they create to win the heart of the girl of their dreams because of their same name 'Balwinder Singh'.

Cast

Shaan as Balwinder Singh
Mika Singh as Balwinder Singh
Gabriela Bertante
Anupam Kher
Rajpal Yadav
Asrani
Vindu Dara Singh
Sunny Leone and Ganesh Acharya in a special appearance in the song "Shake that booty"

Soundtrack
The soundtrack was composed by Lalit Pandit.

Track listing

References

External links
 

2010s Hindi-language films
2010s musical comedy-drama films
2010s comedy thriller films
Indian comedy thriller films
2014 films
Indian musical comedy-drama films
2014 masala films
Films directed by Sunil Agnihotri
2014 comedy films
2014 drama films